Klaas Vantornout (born 19 May 1982 in Torhout) is a Belgian former professional racing cyclist, who rode professionally between 2006 and 2018 for the  and  teams. Vantornout was the winner of the Belgian National Cyclo-cross Championships in 2013 and 2015.

Major results

Cyclo-cross

1999–2000
 3rd National Junior Championships
2000–2001
 1st Lichtaart
2002–2003
 1st Zelzate
2003–2004
 UCI Under-23 World Cup
1st Pijnacker
 Under-23 Superprestige
1st Ruddervoorde
 Under-23 Gazet van Antwerpen
1st Koppenbergcross
 1st Steinmaur
 1st Beuvry
2005–2006
 1st Contern
2006–2007
 2nd National Championships
 UCI World Cup
3rd Igorre
2007–2008
 1st Eeklo
 1st Ichtegem
 1st Overijse
 1st Bredene
 1st Heerlen
 1st Knokke-Heist
2008–2009
 Superprestige
1st Gieten
 1st Bredene
 1st Woerden
2009–2010
 1st Otegem
 2nd  UCI World Championships
 2nd National Championships
2010–2011
 Superprestige
1st Middelkerke
 1st Eeklo
2012–2013
 1st  National Championships
 1st Otegem
 1st Ardooie
 2nd  UCI World Championships
 3rd Overall Superprestige
1st Gieten
1st Middelkerke
2nd Gavere
2nd Hoogstraten
 3rd Mechelen
2013–2014
 Superprestige
1st Ruddervoorde
2nd Hoogstraten
3rd Gavere
3rd Zonhoven
 1st Ardooie
2014–2015
 1st  National Championships
 Superprestige
1st Gavere
 1st Erpe-Mere
2016–2017
 EKZ CrossTour
1st Baden
 3rd Ardooie
2017–2018
 EKZ CrossTour
1st Baden

Road

2012
3rd Ronde van Limburg

References

External links

1982 births
Living people
Belgian male cyclists
Cyclo-cross cyclists
People from Torhout
Cyclists from West Flanders
Belgian cyclo-cross champions